Anamarija Lampič (born 17 June 1995) is a Slovenian biathlete and former cross-country skier. She made her Olympic debut at the 2018 Winter Olympics. She is a triple World Championship medalist.

On 13 May 2022, she announced she was giving up cross-country skiing in favor of biathlon.

Biography
Her father, Janez Lampič was a professional road cyclist who represented Yugoslavia at the 1984 Summer Olympics and competed in the men's team time trial event. Her younger brother, Janez Lampič is also a cross-country skier who competes internationally. Coincidentally, both Janez Lampič and Anamarija Lampič made their Olympic debuts during the 2018 Winter Olympics and competed in the cross-country skiing events.

Cross-country skiing results
All results are sourced from the International Ski Federation (FIS).

Olympic Games

World Championships
3 medals – (1 silver, 2 bronze)

World Cup

Season titles
 2 titles – (1 Sprint, 1 U23)

Season standings

Individual podiums
 3 victories – (1 , 2 ) 
 14 podiums – (10 , 4 )

Team podiums
 1 victory – (1 ) 
 3 podiums – (3 )

References

External links

1995 births
Slovenian female cross-country skiers
Living people
Skiers from Ljubljana
Cross-country skiers at the 2018 Winter Olympics
Cross-country skiers at the 2022 Winter Olympics
Olympic cross-country skiers of Slovenia
Tour de Ski skiers
FIS Nordic World Ski Championships medalists in cross-country skiing
Cross-country skiers at the 2012 Winter Youth Olympics